Elections to Craigavon Borough Council were held on 7 June 2001 on the same day as the other Northern Irish local government elections. The election used four district electoral areas to elect a total of 26 councillors.

Election results

Note: "Votes" are the first preference votes.

Districts summary

|- class="unsortable" align="centre"
!rowspan=2 align="left"|Ward
! % 
!Cllrs
! % 
!Cllrs
! %
!Cllrs
! %
!Cllrs
! % 
!Cllrs
! %
!Cllrs
!rowspan=2|TotalCllrs
|- class="unsortable" align="center"
!colspan=2 bgcolor="" | UUP
!colspan=2 bgcolor="" | SDLP
!colspan=2 bgcolor="" | DUP
!colspan=2 bgcolor="" | Sinn Féin
!colspan=2 bgcolor="" | Alliance
!colspan=2 bgcolor="white"| Others
|-
|align="left"|Craigavon Central
|bgcolor="40BFF5"|29.5
|bgcolor="40BFF5"|2
|16.4
|2
|24.3
|2
|16.9
|1
|3.6
|0
|9.3
|0
|7
|-
|align="left"|Loughside
|4.9
|0
|bgcolor="#99FF66"|47.1
|bgcolor="#99FF66"|3
|2.9
|0
|45.1
|2
|0.0
|0
|0.0
|0
|5
|-
|align="left"|Lurgan
|bgcolor="40BFF5"|47.1
|bgcolor="40BFF5"|4
|7.7
|1
|33.3
|2
|6.8
|0
|0.0
|0
|5.1
|0
|7
|-
|align="left"|Portadown
|26.9
|2
|12.8
|1
|bgcolor="#D46A4C"|27.2
|bgcolor="#D46A4C"|2
|20.2
|1
|2.8
|0
|10.1
|1
|7
|- class="unsortable" class="sortbottom" style="background:#C9C9C9"
|align="left"| Total
|28.1
|8
|20.0
|7
|22.6
|6
|21.3
|4
|1.6
|0
|6.4
|1
|26
|-
|}

District results

Craigavon Central

1997: 3 x UUP, 1 x SDLP, 1 x DUP, 1 x Sinn Féin, 1 x Alliance
2001: 2 x DUP, 2 x UUP, 2 x SDLP, 1 x Sinn Féin
1997-2001 Change: DUP and SDLP gain from UUP and Alliance

Loughside

1997: 4 x SDLP, 1 x Sinn Féin
2001: 3 x SDLP, 2 x Sinn Féin
1997-2001 Change: Sinn Féin gain from SDLP

Lurgan

1997: 5 x UUP, 1 x DUP, 1 x SDLP
2001: 4 x UUP, 2 x DUP, 1 x SDLP
1997-2001 Change: DUP gain from UUP

Portadown

1997: 3 x UUP, 2 x Independent Nationalist, 1 x DUP, 1 x SDLP
2001: 2 x DUP, 2 x UUP, 1 x Sinn Féin, 1 x SDLP, 1 x Independent
1997-2001 Change: DUP, Sinn Féin and Independent gain from UUP and Independent Nationalist (two seats)

References

Craigavon Borough Council elections
Craigavon